Israel ben Meir di Curiel (1501–1573) was a 16th-century rabbi in Safed, Ottoman Syria and member of the prominent Curiel family who were later ennobled by Joao IV of Portugal in 1641.

Biography
Israel ben Meir di Curiel was a disciple of Joseph Fasi in Adrianople and also stayed for a time in Constantinople. In Safed he studied under Isaac Luria and Jacob Berab, by whom he was subsequently ordained. He served together with Joseph Karo and Moses Trani on the Safed beth din (law court). Di Curiel's students included Mordechai HaKohen of Safed and Bezalel Ashkenazi. An outstanding preacher in his time, his homilies were collected and published, in addition to his Or Ẓaddikim (Salonica 1799). The renowned poet Israel Najara was his grandson.

References 

Rabbis in Safed
Kabbalists
16th-century rabbis from the Ottoman Empire
Rabbis in Ottoman Galilee
1501 births
1573 deaths
Jewish scholars
16th-century scholars
Curiel family
Sephardi Jews in Ottoman Palestine

he:משפחת קוריאל#ישראל די קוריאל